Nikolai Semyonovich Artamonov (21 May 1920 — 26 March 1945) was a Soviet fighter pilot who became a flying ace during World War II. Awarded the title Hero of the Soviet Union on 19 August 1944 for his initial victories, by the end of the war he reached a tally of 28 solo and nine shared shootdowns.

References 

1920 births
1945 deaths
Soviet World War II flying aces
Heroes of the Soviet Union
Recipients of the Order of Lenin
Recipients of the Order of the Red Banner
Soviet military personnel killed in World War II
Pilots who performed an aerial ramming